Thomas Gould may refer to:
Thomas Gould (Baptist) (1619–1675), first pastor of the First Baptist Church of Boston in Boston, Massachusetts, USA
Thomas Gould (cricketer) (1863–1948), English cricketer
Thomas Gould (violinist) (born 1983), English violinist
Thomas Ridgeway Gould (1818–1881), American sculptor
Thomas William Gould (1914–2001), English recipient of the Victoria Cross
Thomas Gould (politician), Irish Sinn Féin politician